Rodolfo Cota Robles (born 3 July 1987) is a Mexican professional footballer who plays as a goalkeeper for Liga MX club León and the Mexico national team.

Club career

Pachuca
Cota made his professional debut for Pachuca on 21 September 2007 against Veracruz.

Puebla
In 2014 it was announced Cota was sent out on loan to Puebla. He made his debut against Tijuana in a 1–0 victory. In April 2015, he won the Copa MX after defeating Guadalajara.

Guadalajara
On 11 June 2015, Guadalajara announced they had signed Cota on loan in order to create competition with José Antonio Rodríguez, after club veteran Luis Ernesto Michel was sold to Dorados de Sinaloa. Cota then quickly rose to be  the first-choice goalkeeper after his performances in the Copa MX, becoming champion after defeating Monarcas Morelia the Copa MX final, and became a key figure in the club's twelfth Liga MX title win against Tigres UANL. He was named in the Best XI of the tournament and won the Golden Glove award for the season.

The following season, he proved to be vital again as Guadalajara won the 2018 CONCACAF Champions League against Major League Soccer club Toronto FC,  as he was rewarded the Golden Glove of the tournament and named in the Best XI.

León
On 16 May 2018, Cota was loaned out to Pachuca's sibling club León.

Cota controversially wore a jersey to protest against femicide in Mexico during a match against Club Necaxa on 22 February 2020. The shirt had the figure of a woman lying in a pool of blood in the shape of a map of Mexico. Cota may be suspended for three matches and fined MXN $300,000 (US $15,000).

International career

Youth
Cota represented the under-20 squad at the 2007 FIFA U-20 World Cup.

Senior
In September 2016, Cota received his first senior national team call-up under coach Juan Carlos Osorio for October friendlies against New Zealand and Panama.

Cota was included in the preliminary roster for the 2017 FIFA Confederations Cup in Russia as a replacement for José de Jesús Corona since he picked up an injury. Cota made his debut on 1 June 2017 in a friendly match against Ireland at MetLife Stadium in New Jersey, concluding in a 3–1 victory. Cota was subsequently included in Mexico's final roster for the tournament.

In October 2022, Cota was named in Mexico's preliminary 31-man squad for the 2022 FIFA World Cup, and in November, he was ultimately included in the final 26-man roster, but did not receive any minutes on the field during the tournament.

Career statistics

International

Honours
Puebla
Copa MX: Clausura 2015

Guadalajara
Liga MX: Clausura 2017
Copa MX: Apertura 2015, Clausura 2017
Supercopa MX: 2016
CONCACAF Champions League: 2018

León
Liga MX: Guardianes 2020
Leagues Cup: 2021

Individual
Liga MX Golden Glove: 2016–17
Liga MX Best XI: Clausura 2017
CONCACAF Champions League Golden Glove: 2018
CONCACAF Champions League Best XI: 2018

References

External links
 

1987 births
Living people
Mexican footballers
Mexico under-20 international footballers
Mexico international footballers
C.F. Pachuca players
Club Puebla players
C.D. Guadalajara footballers
Liga MX players
Association football goalkeepers
Footballers from Sinaloa
Sportspeople from Mazatlán
2017 FIFA Confederations Cup players
2021 CONCACAF Gold Cup players
Club León footballers
2022 FIFA World Cup players